The 2023 Des Moines mayoral election will take place in 2023 to elect the mayor of Des Moines, Iowa. The election will be officially nonpartisan. Incumbent mayor Frank Cownie is eligible to run for re-election to a historic sixth term in office.

Candidates

Declared
Denver Foote, cometologist (Party affiliation: Democratic)
Josh Mandelbaum, city councilor for ward 3 (Party affiliation: Democratic)

Potential
Connie Boesen, at-large city councilor and mayor pro tempore (Party affiliation: Democratic)
Frank Cownie, incumbent mayor (Party affiliation: Democratic)

References

External links
Official campaign websites
 Josh Mandelbaum (D) for Mayor
 Denver Foote (D) for Des Moines

Des Moines
Mayoral elections in Des Moines, Iowa
Des Moines